Moose Jaw station is a former railway station in Moose Jaw, Saskatchewan, Canada. It was designed by Hugh G. Jones and built by the Canadian Pacific Railway from 1920 to 1922. The station comprises a two-story waiting area, four storey office block and six-storey  Tyndall stone clock tower.
The building was designated a historic railway station in 1991.

The station was a stop on the Canadian Pacific Railway service. The station was also a transfer point to the Minneapolis, St. Paul and Sault Ste. Marie Railroad, also known as the Soo Line Railroad, which operated from Saint Paul, Minnesota to Portal, North Dakota Soo-Pacific during the summer. It ran through to Vancouver via a connection with Canadian Pacific Railway's The Dominion at Moose Jaw. In the winter the Soo-Dominion terminated in Moose Jaw permitting a transfer to the Dominion. It was discontinued in December 1963.

References 

Designated Heritage Railway Stations in Saskatchewan
Canadian Pacific Railway stations in Saskatchewan
Railway stations in Canada opened in 1922
Disused railway stations in Canada
Buildings and structures in Moose Jaw
Transport in Moose Jaw
1922 establishments in Saskatchewan

External links